Jacopo Ravasi (born 8 February 1987) is an Italian footballer.

Biography
Born in Milan, Lombardy, Ravasi joined F.C. Internazionale Milano in 2003 with number of Monza footballers. From 2004–05 to 2005–06 season he was the member of Berretti under-20 B team. He also played a few games for the spring the A team of U-20. However that team had Matteo Momentè and Domenico Germinale, made Ravasi had a limited chance. He was signed by Pergocrema in mid–2006. He left for Serie D club Sestese in mid-2007. In January 2008 he was signed by Swiss Challenge League club Wil. His goal scoring record made Luzern signed him at the start of 2008–09 Swiss Super League.

In mid-2009 he returned to Italy for Lega Pro Seconda Divisione (Italian fourth division) club Sambonifacese. In January 2010 he was loaned to Valenzana after the signing of Dimas. In mid-2010 he was signed by Renate.

References

External links
Guardian's Stats Centre
 Football.it Profile 

Italian footballers
Swiss Super League players
A.C. Monza players
Inter Milan players
U.S. Pergolettese 1932 players
FC Luzern players
FC Wil players
Valenzana Mado players
Italian expatriate footballers
Expatriate footballers in Switzerland
Italian expatriate sportspeople in Switzerland
Footballers from Milan
1987 births
Living people
Association football forwards
S.C. Caronnese S.S.D. players